Eskdale may refer to:

Australia
Eskdale, Queensland
Eskdale, Victoria

New Zealand
Eskdale, New Zealand

United Kingdom
Eskdale, Cumbria, England
Eskdale, Dumfries and Galloway, Scotland
Eskdale, North Yorkshire, England
Eskdale (UK Parliament constituency), Cumberland, England, former constituency

United States
EskDale, Utah, USA, a religious communal settlement of the Aaronic Order
Eskdale, West Virginia, USA, an unincorporated community in Kanawha County

Other uses
HMS Eskdale, see List of Royal Norwegian Navy ships